Acleris maculopterana is a species of moth of the family Tortricidae. It is found in China (Sichuan).

The wingspan is about 17.2 mm. The forewings are greyish brown with scattered brownish-black tufts of erect scales. The hindwings are light greyish brown. Adults have been recorded on wing in May.

References

Moths described in 1993
maculopterana
Moths of Asia